Naum Batkoski (born 17 May 1978) is a Macedonian footballer who plays as a midfielder for NK Pag.

Club career
Born in Zemun, SR Serbia, at the time still within Yugoslavia, Batkoski spent almost his entire career in Croatia, except the first half of the 2006–07 season which he played with FK Rabotnički in the Macedonian First League. At time of his birth, in 1978, two players named Batkoski were playing at FK Zemun, Milivoje (his father) and Naum.

International career 
He made his senior debut for North Macedonia in a February 2003 friendly match against Croatia and has earned a total of 2 caps, scoring no goals. His second and final international was another February 2003 friendly match against Poland.

References

External links

1978 births
Living people
People from Zemun
Association football midfielders
Macedonian footballers
North Macedonia international footballers
HNK Orijent players
NK Pomorac 1921 players
HNK Rijeka players
FK Rabotnički players
NK Zadar players
NK Novalja players
First Football League (Croatia) players
Croatian Football League players
Macedonian First Football League players
Second Football League (Croatia) players
Macedonian expatriate footballers
Expatriate footballers in Croatia
Macedonian expatriate sportspeople in Croatia